is a Prefectural Natural Park in Yamagata Prefecture, Japan. Established in 1963, the park lies within the municipalities of Kaneyama and Mamurogawa.

See also
 National Parks of Japan

References

Parks and gardens in Yamagata Prefecture
Kaneyama, Yamagata
Mamurogawa, Yamagata
Protected areas established in 1963
1963 establishments in Japan